Mahmui may refer to:
 Mahmui, Birjand, South Khorasan
 Mahmui, Qaen, South Khorasan